Aina Karlsone (13 November 1935 – 17 December 2012) was a Latvian artist and author.

Karlsone gained prominence as an exlibriste, producing approximately 3100 works in her lifetime. Her works were featured in exhibitions both internationally and nationally, including at the Latvian National Library and the Art Academy of Latvia Library.

Bibliography 
 Klūdziņu un sloksnīšu pinumi (1992)
 Mašīnizšūšana (2000)
 Grāmatzīmes Jēkabpils novadam (2004)
 Īpašuma, cieņas un pateicības zīme – Ex libris (2005)

References 

1935 births
2012 deaths
20th-century Latvian women artists
21st-century Latvian women artists
Place of birth missing